is a Japanese literary magazine published monthly by Shinchosha. Since its launch in 1904 it has published the works of many of Japan's leading writers. Along with Bungakukai, Gunzo, Bungei and Subaru, it is one of the five leading literary journals in Japan.

The magazine features English translations of Japanese literary works. It presents the Shincho Literary Award.

See also
List of literary magazines

References

1904 establishments in Japan
Literary magazines published in Japan
Monthly magazines published in Japan
Magazines established in 1904
Shinchosha magazines
Literary translation magazines
Magazines published in Tokyo